The list of rivers of Rajasthan in India.

A 

 Arvari River, Alwar
 Magan River

B 
 Banas River
 Berach River
 Bandi River
 Banganga River (Rajasthan)
 Bhagani River Alwar

C 
 Chambal River

D 

 Dohan river, tributary of Sahibi River, originates near Neem Ka Thana in Alwar district

G 
 Gambhir River
 Ghaggar-Hakra River with numerous Sarasvati-Indus Civilization sites such as Sothi, Banawali, Lohari Ragho, Rakhigarhi, Kunal, etc
 Paleo rivers
 Sarasvati River, paleo name of Ghaggar-Hakra River
 Drishadvati river, paleo tributary of Ghaggar River 
 Present day tributary 
 Chautang, present day remnant of the paleo Drishadvati river

 Gomati River (Rajasthan)
 Garri River

J 
 Jawai River
 Jahajwali River

K 

 Kali Sindh River

 Krishnavati river, tributary of Sahibi River

L
 Luni River

R
 Ruparel River Alwar
 Rupangarh River [Ajmer district| Kucheel]

S

 Sarasvati River, paleo river
 Sabarmati River
 Sahibi River
 Sarsa River, flows through Alwar district
 Sota River, tributary of Sahibi River merges with Sahibi river at Behror in Alwar district
 Sukri

W
 West Banas River north

See also

 
Rivers
Rajasthan
Environment of Rajasthan